The 2016 Big South Conference men's soccer tournament, was the 33rd edition of the tournament. It determined the Big South Conference's automatic berth into the 2016 NCAA Division I Men's Soccer Championship.

Regular season champions, Radford won their third Big South title, defeating in-state rival, Longwood, 1–0 in the championship match. Radford's Sivert Daehlie scored the match-winning header in the 85th minute of play. It was Radford's first conference championship since 2000. Longwood was in their first Big South Conference championship, and were in their first conference championship since they reached the Atlantic Soccer Conference Tournament championship in 2011.

Qualification 

The top six teams in the Big South Conference based on their conference regular season records qualified for the tournament.

Bracket

References

External links 
 Big South Soccer Tournament Central
 Big South Tournament Bracket

Big South Conference Men's Soccer Tournament
Big South Conference Men's Soccer
Big South Conference Men's Soccer Tournament